Laureano Rosas (born 23 August 1990 in Las Flores, Buenos aires) is an Argentine cyclist, who currently rides for UCI Continental team . He rode in the time trial at the 2015 Pan American Games, finishing in 6th place.

Major results

2011
 2nd Time trial, National Under-23 Road Championships
 2nd Overall Clásica del Oeste-Doble Bragado
1st Stage 2
2012
 1st Overall Clásica del Oeste-Doble Bragado
1st Stages 8
 Pan American Road Championships
4th Under-23 road race
10th Road race
2013
 1st Overall Rutas de América
1st Stages 1, 6 & 7b
 2nd Overall Giro del Sol San Juan
1st Stage 8
2014
 1st  Time trial, National Road Championships
 1st Overall Vuelta a San Juan
1st Stages 7 & 8
 1st Overall Clásica del Oeste-Doble Bragado
1st Stage 8
 1st Clásica de Venado Tuerto
2015
 1st Overall Vuelta a San Juan
1st Stages 2, 4, 6 & 7
 1st Stage 4 Giro del Sol San Juan
 5th Overall Vuelta del Uruguay
1st Stage 4
 6th Time trial, Pan American Games
2016
 1st  Time trial, National Road Championships
 1st Overall Vuelta a San Juan
1st Stages 2, 3, 4, 5 & 7
 1st Overall Clásica del Oeste-Doble Bragado
1st Stage 6
 2nd  Time trial, Pan American Road Championships
 2nd Overall Vuelta del Uruguay
1st Stage 8
2017
 6th Overall Vuelta a San Juan
2019
 8th Time trial, Pan American Road Championships
2022
 6th Overall Vuelta del Porvenir San Luis
1st Stage 3 (ITT)

References

External links

1990 births
Living people
Argentine male cyclists
Cyclists at the 2015 Pan American Games
Pan American Games competitors for Argentina
Sportspeople from Buenos Aires Province